Szabolcs Mezei (born 27 September 2000) is a Hungarian football player who plays as winger for MTK Budapest in Nemzeti Bajnokság I.

Career statistics
.

References

2000 births
Living people
Hungarian footballers
Hungary youth international footballers
People from Békéscsaba
Association football midfielders
Nemzeti Bajnokság I players
MTK Budapest FC players
Békéscsaba 1912 Előre footballers
Sportspeople from Békés County
21st-century Hungarian people